WQLR (94.7 FM) is a non-commercial religious FM radio station licensed to Chateaugay, New York owned by the Educational Media Foundation airing the EMF's K-Love Contemporary Christian format. The station is a border blaster, predominantly serving Greater Montreal and the Seaway River Valley, including Cornwall, Ontario and Massena, New York. 

WQLR has an effective radiated power (ERP) of 11,000 watts. Its city-grade signal reaches the southwestern portion of Greater Montreal, while its C2 class signal covers most of Montreal proper. In the eastern part of Montreal, the signal receives strong interference from co-channel CHEY-FM, Rouge FM's signal based in Trois-Rivières.

History

The station was built by the Martz Communications Group, and signed on as WXEB in 1992, before changing its call letters to WEEP the same year, and then WYUL in 1993 (a nod to its listeners in Montreal; YUL is the IATA code for Montréal–Trudeau International Airport). The station was originally a simulcast of CHR/Top 40-formatted WYSX in Ogdensburg until 2002, when the station segued to its own "94.7 Hits FM" branding and format. WYUL became Montreal's first English-language contemporary hit radio station since 1991, when CHTX ("990 Hits") left the Top 40 format. Under Martz ownership, WYUL's sister stations were WVNV and WICY, both licensed to Malone. 

As a U.S.-based station licensed by the Federal Communications Commission, WYUL was exempt from Canadian Radio-television and Telecommunications Commission regulations regarding Canadian content and the language of broadcast. To that end, and because of the signal's penetration into the Montreal area, WYUL's slogan was "Montreal's Hottest Music". Though it primarily broadcast in English, this allowed the station to accept French-language advertising, which is not permitted on Canadian-licensed English-language stations. It also targeted Cornwall, Ontario. Because WYUL was not a Canadian station, BBM Canada did not measure WYUL's audience. 

On June 28, 2021, Martz announced that it is selling WYUL and co-owned WVNV to the Educational Media Foundation (EMF), which runs two national Christian radio music services, K-Love and Air1.  This would give EMF its first entry into the Montreal radio market albeit on an American radio signal. The last song played on "94.7 Hits FM" was "In The End" by Linkin Park on September 30, 2021. The station went silent at midnight, followed by K-Love programming starting the next day. The station changed its call letters to WQLR on October 5, 2021. With this move, CJFM and French-language CKOI remain as the last two contemporary hit radio stations that are able to be received in Chateaugay, New York.

References

External links
 

QLR
K-Love radio stations
Educational Media Foundation radio stations
Radio stations established in 1997
1997 establishments in New York (state)
Contemporary Christian radio stations in the United States